Loharpatti (Nepali: लोहरपट्टी) is a municipality in Mahottari District in Province No. 2 of Nepal. It was formed in 2016 occupying current 9 sections (wards) from previous 9 former VDCs. It occupies an area of 50.06 km2 with a total population of 39,571.

References

Populated places in Mahottari District
Nepal municipalities established in 2017
Municipalities in Madhesh Province